Djinba may be,

Djinba people
Djinba language